Vince malum bono or Vince in bono malum is a Latin phrase meaning Overcome evil with good or Defeat Evil with Good.

The phrase is used as a motto at a number of institutions:

Anahuac Universities Network
Bishop Cotton School, Shimla
Old Swinford Hospital
St. Paul's Senior High School, Denu, Ghana (formerly St. Paul's Secondary  School)
Catholic Memorial School
 Inscription above entrance to Florentine Hotel, Sheffield

External links

 "Latin Vulgate, Romans 12:21"

New Testament Latin words and phrases
Vulgate Latin words and phrases
Epistle to the Romans